Sidney Wheeler (1864–1950) was an English-Australian actor who worked extensively in film, TV and radio. He worked a number of times for Ken G. Hall.

He was named as a co-respondent in a divorce case.

Select film credits
Lovers and Luggers (1937)
Dad and Dave Come to Town (1938)
Mr Chedworth Steps Out (1938)
Come Up Smiling (1939)
The Power and the Glory (1941)

Select stage appearances
Ball at the Savoy (1935)
Annie Get Your Gun (1949–50)

References

External links

Sidney Wheeler Australian theatre credits at AusStage
Sidney Wheeler at National Film and Sound Archive

1864 births
1951 deaths
Australian male film actors
Australian male radio actors
Date of birth missing
Place of birth missing
Date of death missing
Place of death missing